Kim Benson (née Labuschagne; born September 11, 1967), formerly Kim Barry, is a South African-American former professional tennis player.

Labuschagne, who grew up in Pretoria, played collegiate tennis for Texas A&M in the late 1980s. She was the program's first All-American in 1987, when she reached the singles quarter-finals of the NCAA championships. Her first husband Van Barry was an assistant coach for the team and later her personal coach.

While competing on the professional tour, Labuschagne had a career high singles ranking of 187 in the world. Her best performance in a WTA Tour tournament was a second round appearance at the San Juan Open in 1987. She featured in the qualifying draw for the 1988 French Open.

ITF finals

Singles: 4 (2–2)

Doubles: 3 (1–2)

References

External links
 
 
 

1967 births
Living people
South African female tennis players
American female tennis players
Texas A&M Aggies women's tennis players
Sportspeople from Pretoria
South African emigrants to the United States